Albar may refer to:

 Ludovic Albar (born 1969), French science fiction author
 Syed Hamid Albar (born 1944), Malaysian politician, member of UMNO and son of Syed Jaafar Albar
 Syed Jaafar Albar (1914–1977), Malaysian politician and member of UMNO 
 Albar (car), Swiss car marque